The Sweden men's national ice hockey team is governed by the Swedish Ice Hockey Association. It is one of the most successful national ice hockey teams in the world and a member of the so-called "Big Six", the unofficial group of the six strongest men's ice hockey nations, along with Canada, the Czech Republic, Finland, Russia and the United States.

The team's nickname Tre Kronor, meaning "Three Crowns", refers to the emblem on the team jersey, which is found in the lesser national coat of arms of the Kingdom of Sweden. The first time this emblem was used on the national team's jersey was on 12 February 1938, during the World Championships in Prague.

The team has won numerous medals at both the World Championships and the Winter Olympics. In 2006, they became the first team to win both tournaments in the same calendar year, by winning the 2006 Winter Olympics in a thrilling final against Finland by 3–2, and the 2006 World Championships by beating Czech Republic in the final, 4–0. In 2013 the team was the first team to win the World Championships at home since the Soviet Union in 1986. In 2018, the Swedish team won its 11th title at the World Championships. In 2021 Sweden failed to reach the playoffs for the first time after the tournament implemented the playoff system, placing 9th, tying their 1937 team for their worst placement in tournament history.

Tournament record

Olympic Games

Canada Cup
1976 – 4th
1981 – 5th
1984 – 
1987 – 
1991 – 4th

World Cup
1996 – 
2004 – 5th
2016 –

European Championship
1921 – 
1922 – 
1923 – 
1924 – 
1932 –

World Championship
1931 – 6th place
1935 – 5th place
1937 – 9th place
1938 – 5th place
1947 – 
1949 – 4th place
1950 – 5th place
1951 – 
1953 – 
1954 – 
1955 – 5th place
1957 – 
1958 – 
1959 – 5th place
1961 – 4th place
1962 – 
1963 – 
1965 – 
1966 – 4th place
1967 – 
1969 – 
1970 – 
1971 – 
1972 – 
1973 – 
1974 – 
1975 – 
1976 – 
1977 – 
1978 – 4th place
1979 – 
1981 – 
1982 – 4th place
1983 – 4th place
1985 – 6th place
1986 – 
1987 – 
1989 – 4th place
1990 – 
1991 – 
1992 – 
1993 – 
1994 – 
1995 – 
1996 – 5th place
1997 – 
1998 – 
1999 – 
2000 – 7th place
2001 – 
2002 – 
2003 – 
2004 – 
2005 – 4th place
2006 – 
2007 – 4th place
2008 – 4th place
2009 –

Current roster
Roster for the 2022 IIHF World Championship.

Head coach: Johan Garpenlöv

All-time team record
The following table shows Sweden's all-time international record in official matches (WC, OG, EC), correct as of 21 May 2015.

Teams named in italics are no longer active.

Awards
The team received the Svenska Dagbladet Gold Medal in 1987, shared with Marie-Helene Westin.

Uniform evolution

References

External links

IIHF profile
National Teams of Ice Hockey

 
National ice hockey teams in Europe
1920 establishments in Sweden